The Battle of Thielt (1128), also known as the Battle of Axpoel, was a battle fought on June 21, 1128, between the forces of William Clito on one side and the forces of Thierry of Alsace. The battle resulted in victory for William Clito and defeat for Thierry of Alsace.

Background

Prior to the battle, Thierry besieged the fortress of Fulk, a vassal of William Clito. William carefully scouted the terrain in the area and Thierry's army.

Battle

William's Tactical Deployment

William's reconnaissance led him to arrange his forces into three divisions of equal strength, but he placed one division behind a hill in reserve. This force was completely hidden from Thierry.

Course of Events

William's first two divisions and all of Thierry's cavalry rode at each other and engaged in close combat. After some fierce fighting, William ordered a retreat with Thierry's cavalry in hot pursuit. However, once they crested the hill, William's reserve cavalry surprised Thierry's forces. William also gathered his knights, reformed, and charged again. Thus, Thierry's pursuit was quickly turned into a rout of his own forces.

Notes

Bibliography
Marvin, Laurence W. (2016) Medieval and Modern C2: Command and Control in the Field during Western Europe's Long Twelfth Century (1095–1225), War & Society, 35(3), 152–179, DOI: https://doi.org/10.1080/07292473.2016.1196921

Marvin, Laurence W. (2010) Thielt, Battle of, The Oxford Encyclopedia of Medieval Warfare and Military Technology, Oxford University Press

Oman, Sir Charles. (1898) A History of the Art of War in the Middle Ages, Routledge

Verbruggen, J. F. (1997:1954) The Art of Warfare in Western Europe During the Middle Ages: From the Eighth Century to 1340, The Boydell Press

Thielt
Thielt
1100s in Europe
Military history of Belgium